John Dimes is an author, artist, singer, actor and award-winning comedian. He is best known as the horror host Dr. Sarcofiguy, the first (and still only) African-American horror host.

In addition to this, Dimes has written several novels, such as the graphic novel Tales of Home, the surreal thriller Coincidissonance and the mockumentary guidebook The White Corpse Hustle: A Guide for the Fledgeling Vampire, which has been favorably compared to the writings of Douglas Adams. This is the first of a planned trilogy. Outside of his illustrations for his novels, Dimes' artwork has been showcased in Washington, D.C. galleries.

Background
Dimes began performing as a stand-up comedian, working alongside David Chapelle, Patton Oswalt and Wanda Sykes. He has appeared in several independent films, including the satire The Blair Bitch Project (1999) and the documentaries The Wave (1996) and American Scary (2006), which screened at the 2007 San Diego Comic Con. In 1995 John sang on the stage of the Apollo Theatre, and later that same year, Halloween 1995, his program, The Spooky Movie, debuted on Falls Church Community TV (formerly "Channel 38"), where it continues to run every Friday night. TSM can be seen around the country through the Horror Host Underground Network.

In 2006 and 2007 Sarcofiguy made appearances on the television program Monster Madhouse Live and in October of both years co-hosted "The Spooky Movie Film Festival" in Fairfax, Virginia with his friend, and childhood idol, "Count Gore de Vol", Washington-Baltimore's popular 1970s and 1980s horror host. Sarcofiguy is a regular contributor to "The Count's" weekly webprogram.

References

External links

"The White Corpse Hustle"
MySpace Page

Living people
Absurdist fiction
American comedy writers
American humorists
21st-century American novelists
American fantasy writers
American television writers
American male television writers
African-American male comedians
American male comedians
American male novelists
American male screenwriters
21st-century American male writers
Screenwriters from Washington, D.C.
21st-century American comedians
21st-century American screenwriters
1966 births
21st-century African-American writers
20th-century African-American people
African-American male writers